Collingham Bridge railway station was a railway station serving the villages of Collingham and Linton in West Yorkshire, England. The station opened on 1 May 1876, and closed on 6 January 1964. The station's coal yard is now a car park for the River Wharfe with the location for the original station much further to the South West, aligning with the current Linton Road.

Lines

References

External links
 Collingham Bridge station on navigable 1947 O. S. map

Disused railway stations in Leeds
Beeching closures in England
Former North Eastern Railway (UK) stations
Railway stations in Great Britain opened in 1876
Railway stations in Great Britain closed in 1964